These are the results of the men's C-1 10000 metres competition in canoeing at the 1948 Summer Olympics.  The C-1 event is raced by single-man sprint canoes and took place on August 11.

Final
With only five competitors in the event, a final was held.

References

1948 Summer Olympics official report. p. 313.
Sports-reference.com 1948 C-1 10000 m results.

Men's C-1 10000
Men's events at the 1948 Summer Olympics